The Arizona Complex League Athletics are a Minor League Baseball team based in Phoenix, Arizona, which plays as a Rookie-level team in the Arizona Complex League and has served as a farm team for the Oakland Athletics organization since 1988. They play their home games at Fitch Park, the minor league spring training camp of the Oakland Athletics. The team is composed mainly of players who are in their first year of professional baseball either as draftees or non-drafted free agents from the United States, Canada, Dominican Republic, Venezuela, and other countries.

History
The team first competed in the Arizona League (AZL) in 1988, and has been a member of the league continuously since then. During the 2019 season, the team fielded two squads in the league, differentiated by Green and Gold suffixes. Prior to the 2021 season, the Arizona League was renamed as the Arizona Complex League (ACL).

Rosters

References

External links
 Official website (Green)
 Official website (Gold)

Baseball teams established in 1988
Arizona Complex League teams
Professional baseball teams in Arizona
Oakland Athletics minor league affiliates
1988 establishments in Arizona
Sports in Mesa, Arizona